Ogliastro may refer to:

Ogliastro, a French municipality of the department of Haute-Corse, Corsica
Ogliastro (Maratea), an Italian locality of Maratea, Basilicata
Ogliastro Cilento, an Italian municipality of the Province of Salerno, Campania
Ogliastro Marina, an Italian village and hamlet of Castellabate, Campania

See also
Ogliastra, an Italian province of Sardinia